Zahoor Elahi Stadium is a cricket ground in Gujrat, Pakistan. This stadium regularly hosts Inter-district and Inter-region tournaments. Other than that it has hosted a total of 14 grade II matches and one first class match. It is the home ground of Gujrat cricket team and Gujrat Under-19s.

It is named after Pakistani politician Chaudhry Zahoor Elahi.

Ground History

Zahoor Elahi Stadium was previously known as the Horse show Ground. The reason behind this name was a horse show which was held here annually till the late nineties. It was rebuilt during the years 2001 and 2002. After the renovation in March 2002 Horse showground was renamed as Zahoor Elahi Stadium to honour the late politician Chaudhry Zahoor Elahi.

Cricket History 
Zahoor Elahi Stadium has never hosted an international match and as of now it is not recognized as a First-class ground either by Pakistan Cricket Board thus it no longer hosts first-class matches however it has served as home ground for Gujrat cricket team in a number of other tournaments including Inter-district senior and under-19 tournaments.

First-class Matches
 
Zahoor Elahi Stadium hosted its only first-class match during the group stage of 2012–13 Quaid-e-Azam Trophy on 28 December 2012.

Scorecard Sialkot vs Lahore Ravi

Grade II Matches
Zahoor Elahi stadium hosted 14 grade II matches during year 2001 and 2003.

Under-19 Tournament (Grade II) 2001/02
Zahoor Elahi stadium hosted its first match during the 2001/02 season of grade II under-19 tournament. It hosted a total of three matches during that season.

Quaid-e-Azam Trophy (Grade II) 2001/02
Zahoor Elahi stadium also hosted three matches from Quaid-e-Azam trophy during the season 2001/02

Under-19 Tournament (Grade II) 2002/03
Zahoor Elahi stadium hosted 5 matches during season 2002/03 of grade II Under-19s tournament

Cornelius Trophy 2002/03
Zahoor Elahi stadium hosted another 3 grade II matches during the Cornellius Trophhy 2002/03

Other Matches
As of 2014 Zahoor Elahi stadium regularly hosts matches from different Inter-district and Inter-region/department tournaments. The stadium has also hosted a number of charity matches

Other Events
Zahoor Elahi Stadium has been used for a  number of purposes beside cricket.

Election Campaigns

This stadium gets a fair share of political jamborees often during election days. Recent example being PTI's jalsa during which the stadium accommodated almost 10,000 people

Industrial Exhibition

The stadium has also been the host to all 6 Industrial exhibitions conducted by Gujrat chamber of commerce annually.

Charity Matches

More than a couple of charity matches have been held at Zahoor Elahi Stadium. Such as a T20 exhibition match on 4 May 2012 saw a number of international cricketers such including former captain Shahid Afridi, Shoaib Malik, Imran Nazir, Abdul Razaq, Kamran Akmal and Umar Akmal. Another such match in July 2014 saw huge attendance.

Punjab Youth Festival

Zahoor elahi stadium is recognized as a sports facility by sports board Punjab and it regularly hosts competitions which are part of Punjab youth Festival.

Other Sports

The Ground often hosts local Kabaddi matches. It is also known to be the host of Jashn-e-baharan sports festival.

References

Cricket
Stadiums in Pakistan
Cricket grounds in Pakistan
Gujrat, Pakistan